Rangiroa is a commune of French Polynesia in the archipelago of the Tuamotu Islands. The commune includes four islands: Rangiroa, Tikehau, Mataiva and Makatea. The chef-lieu is the village Tiputa.

Geography

Commune of Rangiroa
The commune  is composed of three atolls and one island:

1 Commune associée

Administration

See also

 Communes of French Polynesia

References

External links

Communes of French Polynesia